A Wobbly is a member of the Industrial Workers of the World (IWW).

Wobbly may also refer to:

 Wobbly (musician)
 The Wobbly (novel), a 1926 novel by B. Traven